Moorella stamsii  is a thermophilic and anaerobic bacterium from the genus Moorella, which has been isolated from the suspended sludge in a municipal solid waste digester in Barcelona, Spain.

References

 

Thermoanaerobacterales
Bacteria described in 2013
Thermophiles
Anaerobes